Helen Haye (born Helen Hay, 28 August 1874 – 1 September 1957) was a British stage and film actress.

Stage
Hay began acting on the stage in 1898 and debuted in London in 1911 as Gertrude in Hamlet. In 1927, she starred in John Van Druten's Chance Acquaintance at the Criterion Theatre. In 1950, she was in Benn Levy's Return to Tyassi at the Duke of York's Theatre.

Films
Her film career began in 1916 with Honour in Pawn. She often worked with director Alexander Korda. One of her later film appearances was in Laurence Olivier's Richard III (1955), as the Duchess of York.

Haye died four days after her 83rd birthday in London.

Selected filmography

 Honour in Pawn (1916) - Mrs. Fortescue
 Masks and Faces (1917) - Dame Best
 Not Negotiable (1918)
 His Last Defence (1919) - Hesper Oddington
 Bleak House (1920) - Miss Barbay
 The Skin Game (1921) - Mrs. Hillcrist
 Tilly of Bloomsbury (1921) - Lady Adela Mainwaring
 Atlantic (1929) - Clara Tate-Hughes
 Knowing Men (1930) - Marquise de Jarmais
 The Nipper (1930) - Lady Sevenoaks
 Beyond the Cities (1930) - Amy Hayes
 The Skin Game (1931) - Mrs. Hillcrist
 Brown Sugar (1931) - Lady Knightsbridge
 The Officers' Mess (1931) - Mrs. Harbottle
 Monte Carlo Madness (1932) - Isabel
 Congress Dances (1932) - Princess
 Her First Affaire (1932) - Lady Bragden
 It's a Boy (1933) - Mrs. Bogle
 This Week of Grace (1933) - Lady Warmington
 Money Mad (1934) - Lady Leyland
 Crazy People (1934) - Aunt Caroline
 The Dictator (1935) - Queen Mother Juliana
 Drake of England (1935) - Lady Lennox
 The 39 Steps (1935) - Mrs. Jordan
 The Tunnel (1935) - Oil Magnate (uncredited)
 Wolf's Clothing (1936) - Mildred Girling
 The Interrupted Honeymoon (1936) - Aunt Harriet
 Everybody Dance (1936) - Lady Morton
 Wings of the Morning (1937) - Aunt Jenepher
 Cotton Queen (1937) - Margaret Owen
 The Girl in the Taxi (1937) - Delphine des Aubrais
 Sidewalks of London (1938) - Selina
 A Girl Must Live (1939) - Aunt Primrose
 Riding High (1939) - Miss Ada Broadbent
 The Spy in Black (1939) - Mrs. Sedley
 The Case of the Frightened Lady (1940) - Lady Lebanon
 Kipps (1941) - Mrs. Walshingham
 The Man in Grey (1943) - Lady Rohan
 Dear Octopus (1943) - Dora Randolph
 Fanny by Gaslight (1944) - Mrs. Somerford
 Madonna of the Seven Moons (1945) - Mother Superior
 A Place of One's Own (1945) - Mrs. Manning Tutthorn
 Mine Own Executioner (1947) - Lady Maresfield
 Mrs. Fitzherbert (1947) - Lady Sefton
 Anna Karenina (1948) - Countess Vronsky
 Third Time Lucky (1949) - Old Lady
 Conspirator (1949) - Lady Witheringham
 Front Page Story (1954) - Susan's Mother
 Hobson's Choice (1954) - Mrs. Hepworth
 Lilacs in the Spring (1954) - Lady Drayton
 Richard III (1955) - Duchess of York
 My Teenage Daughter (1956) - Aunt Louisa
 Action of the Tiger (1957) - Countess Valona
 The Gypsy and the Gentleman (1958) - Lady Caroline Ayrton (final film role)

References

External links

1874 births
1957 deaths
People educated at Bedford High School, Bedfordshire
British film actresses
British stage actresses
English stage actresses
English film actresses
English silent film actresses
Actresses from London
British people in colonial India
20th-century English actresses